, or JOLF, is a Japanese radio station in Yurakucho, Chiyoda ward, Tokyo, next to the Tokyo Imperial Palace. Founded in 1954, it is together with Nippon Cultural Broadcasting, the flagship station of the National Radio Network.  Nippon Broadcasting System is a subsidiary of Fuji Media Holdings and both companies are affiliated with the Fujisankei Communications Group. It is also the main company of the Nippon Broadcasting Group. Nippon Broadcasting System was instrumental in the creation of several companies including Fuji Television in 1957, Pony Canyon in 1966 and the Fujisankei Communications Group in 1967. Nippon Broadcasting System is also the home of the long-running radio program All Night Nippon.

From July 15, 1954, to September 30, 1967,  the station used the abbreviation  "NBS" derived from Nippon Broadcasting System. Since October 1, 1967, it has used the call sign JOLF and identified itself with the last two letters "LF".

In 1990, Nippon Broadcasting System sued its rival Radio Nippon  to prevent it from using both the "R · F · Radio Japan" and "Radio Japan" trademarks. Nippon Broadcasting System lost the lawsuit.

A labor union was formed at Nippon Broadcasting System for the first time in September 12, 2005.

Nippon Broadcasting System was historically the parent company of Fuji Television despite the latter being a much larger company than the former. Both companies were founded in the 1950s and were part of the Fujisankei Communications Group. In 2005, the relation between the two companies was reversed and Nippon Broadcasting System became the subsidiary of Fuji Television.

In April 2006, the radio broadcaster and its station license was spun off into a new separate company called "Nippon Broadcasting System" owned by Fuji Television.  Fuji Television absorbed the rest of the old Nippon Broadcasting System company that was founded in 1954 and took over its assets. As a result, former subsidiaries of Nippon Broadcasting System such as Pony Canyon were transferred to Fuji Television who was later renamed Fuji Media Holdings in 2008.

References

External links
 
  

Radio in Japan
Mass media companies based in Tokyo
Radio stations established in 1954
Fuji TV
Fujisankei Communications Group